John Martin Crawford (October 18, 1845 – 1916) was an American physician and scholar who translated the Finnish epic Kalevala into English based on a previous German translation by Franz Anton Schiefner published in 1852, to be published for the first time in 1888.

Biography
He was born in Herrick, Pennsylvania and taught public school for three years prior to attending college. He enrolled in Lafayette College in 1867 and graduated in 1871. It was there he was inspired by Professor Thomas Conrad Porter to translate the Kalevala. In 1872 Crawford returned to teaching Math and Latin at the Chickering Institute in Ohio. During this time he studied Medicine, receiving three degrees from schools in Cincinnati.

In June 1889, Crawford was appointed by President Benjamin Harrison as consul-general of the United States to Russia.

He also translated the five volume series "Industries of Russia" published in 1893 for World's Columbian Exposition.

Published works

 ,  e-text via www.gutenberg.org
 , e-text via www.gutenberg.org

References

External links

 
 
 
 

1845 births
1916 deaths
German–English translators
19th-century American translators